Lawrenceville is a town in Brunswick County, Virginia, United States. Per the 2020 census, the population was 1,014. Located by the Meherrin River, it is the county seat of Brunswick County. In colonial times, Lieutenant Governor Alexander Spotswood had a stockade built nearby, called Fort Christanna, where converted Native American allies were housed and educated.

Historically black Saint Paul's College, founded in 1888 and affiliated with the Episcopal Church, operated here until 2013. Lumber, tobacco, livestock, and other farm products are grown in the area. In a county along the southern border of the state, the town is near the northernmost area for cotton growing.

History
The county was an area of tobacco production in colonial times, and later mixed farming, both dependent on enslaved African-American workers. In addition to Fort Christanna and St. Paul's College, the Brunswick County Courthouse Square, Gholson Bridge, and Lawrenceville Historic District are significant points of interest.

The first recorded foray by the colonists into what is now Brunswick County occurred in 1650.

1700s

Explorers left Fort Henry (Petersburg) to follow the Occoneeche trail on an expedition for trading with the Indians to the south. By 1714 the area was known well enough that it was selected by Governor Alexander Spotswood as the site of Fort Christanna, a trading depot and school for Indian children.

In 1720 the General Assembly passed an act for “erecting the Counties of Spotsylvania and Brunswick” which directed “That five hundred pounds…be paid by the Treasurer to Nathaniel Harrison, esq., Jonathan Allen, Henry Harrison, and William Edwards, gentlemen… for a church, courthouse, prison, pillory and stocks, where they shall think fit.”

The first courthouse was constructed circa 1732 on a site near Cochran. Moved to the east in 1746, the county seat was moved again in 1783 to be established at the present site. A wood-frame courthouse, described by a visitor in 1835 as “a very handsome building” was built in 1784 on the site now occupied by the Brunswick County Museum.

1800s

The Town was created officially by an act of the General Assembly on 22 January 1814. The act directed that twenty acres of land belonging to Peggy Williams be laid off into lots and be known as Lawrenceville. Legend has it that the name was inspired by a famous racehorse, Lawrence, owned by a prosperous landowner who had built a nearby race track at the end of the eighteenth century.

By 1836 the town was served by at least two stage routes as noted on the Tourist's Pocket Map of the State of Virginia published that year. One ran north and south between Petersburg and Warrenton, N. C., daily. The other, east and west between Lawrenceville and Halifax Courthouse three times a week.

The coming of the railroad in 1890 gave an impetus for growth. Establishment of the Atlantic and Danville shops in Lawrenceville provided the town with a significant industrial base. The mercantile buildings along Main and Hicks Streets were transformed from one and two story wood-frame buildings into two and three story brick masonry buildings over the next four decades. Residential areas quickly developed to satisfy the demand for housing. In 1907 the population was described as about 2,000 “law-abiding and God-fearing people.

Incorporation

In 1846 the town was described thus: “It is a neat village, pleasantly situated on a branch of the Meherrin River, and contains 2 churches and about 25 dwellings.” One of the churches, St. Andrew's Episcopal, constructed in 1829, continues to serve its parishioners as the oldest public building extant in Lawrenceville.

Richard H. Sharp gave land on Church Street in 1847 for construction of the Lawrenceville Methodist Church. The original building was replaced by the present sanctuary in 1906.

The Greek Revival courthouse, which remains on Courthouse Square, was constructed in 1854 to succeed the late 18th century structure. County court records were maintained on the first floor there until completion of the adjacent Clerk's Building in 1893. These two buildings are included in the Brunswick County Courthouse Square nomination approved for inclusion in the National Register in 1974.

Incorporation for the Town of Lawrenceville was achieved in 1874. Mr. Charles E. May later recalled the town of that era as “a very small village consisting of a courthouse, a few small stores, two blacksmith shops, a shoe maker’s shop and several dwellings.”

In 1888 James Solomon Russell, an Episcopal priest born into slavery in 1857, established a parish school for black children. By 1893 the school was incorporated and became the Saint Paul's Normal and Industrial School. Dr. Russell's efforts were blessed with continuing success. The school became Saint Paul's College in 1957 and attracts students from around the globe. Three of the early buildings remaining on campus have been listed in the National Register of Historic Places.

Recent Decades

A bond issue passed in 1912 to fund construction of a water filtration plant and distribution system, a gravity sewage system, and an electric generating plant. The newly organized volunteer fire department constructed a firehouse on Sharp Street adjacent to the then new 100,000 gallon elevated water tank. The original fire alarm bell was moved to the grounds of the Municipal Building on Main Street in 1980 where it rests with an old road marker of 1819 inscribed “45 miles from the Brunswick Courthouse to Petersburg.”

Lawrenceville continued as the major market center for the rich agricultural areas of Brunswick County as evidenced by the tobacco warehouses, cotton gins, creameries, etc. which came and went during the first half of the twentieth century.

In 1924 the streets were paved with concrete. Sale of the electric generating plant in 1925 provided money for replacing the wood plank sidewalks with concrete. During the depression years of the thirties, federal funds were used to build a baseball field and a swimming pool.

The town now is engaged in a beautification project which involves replacing downtown sidewalks with brick and installing new streetlights. The new Albertis S. Harrison, Jr., Courthouse housing Brunswick's Circuit, General District, and Juvenile and Domestic Relations courts was dedicated on 18 April 1999. Documentation and field work has been completed for the Lawrenceville Historic District and the nomination was submitted in the fall of 1999.

Downtown Lawrenceville is now listed on the National Register of Historic Places. The historic district connects with the developing Tobacco Heritage Trail, a segment of the national rails to trails movement, which attracts horseback riders, bikers, joggers, wildlife enthusiasts, and hikers.

Geography
According to the United States Census Bureau, the town has a total area of 0.9 square miles (2.4 km2), all of it land.

Demographics

2020 census

Note: the US Census treats Hispanic/Latino as an ethnic category. This table excludes Latinos from the racial categories and assigns them to a separate category. Hispanics/Latinos can be of any race.

2000 Census
As of the census of 2000, there were 1,275 people, 376 households, and 209 families living in the town. The population density was 1,391.1 people per square mile (535.1/km2). There were 459 housing units at an average density of 500.8 per square mile (192.6/km2). The racial makeup of the town was 33.25% White, 64.63% African American, 0.31% Native American, 0.24% Asian, and 1.57% from two or more races. Hispanic or Latino of any race were 1.41% of the population.

There were 376 households, out of which 24.5% had children under the age of 18 living with them, 35.1% were married couples living together, 13.8% had a female householder with no husband present, and 44.4% were non-families. 39.6% of all households were made up of individuals, and 21.3% had someone living alone who was 65 years of age or older. The average household size was 2.35 and the average family size was 3.16.

In the town, the population was spread out, with 17.3% under the age of 18, 33.2% from 18 to 24, 17.5% from 25 to 44, 18.2% from 45 to 64, and 13.8% who were 65 years of age or older. The median age was 25 years. For every 100 females, there were 76.6 males. For every 100 females age 18 and over, there were 73.4 males.

The median income for a household in the town was $28,594, and the median income for a family was $41,875. Males had a median income of $31,583 versus $18,056 for females. The per capita income for the town was $12,353. About 12.7% of families and 21.8% of the population were below the poverty line, including 23.2% of those under age 18 and 18.8% of those age 65 or over.

Government

The Town of Lawrenceville serves as the county seat for Brunswick County, Virginia.

The Town of Lawrenceville operates under the council-manager form of government, in accordance with Title 15.2, Chapter 6 of the Code of Virginia.

Notable people

 Duke Brett, former Major League Baseball pitcher
 George Coke Dromgoole, who represented Virginia in the United States House of Representatives, was born in Lawrenceville.
 Thomas Emmerson, Tennessee judge and first mayor of Knoxville, Tennessee, was born here.
 E. Franklin Frazier, sociologist and author of the classic Black Bourgeoisie, taught at St. Paul's College.
 Albertis Harrison, state Governor from 1962 to 1966, was a native of Lawrenceville, where he practiced law.
 John Hartwell Marable, who represented Tennessee in the House of Representatives, was born here.
 David Nolan, author and historian, worked for the Virginia Students Civil Rights Committee in Lawrenceville in the 1960s.
 Chandler Owen, co-editor, with A. Philip Randolph of The Messenger, attended St. Paul's College.
 Goronwy Owen (1723-1769) author of Welsh poetry, Vicar of St Andrews Episcopal Church in Lawrenceville, and local cotton and tobacco plantation owner
 Peter B. Starke, former Confederate States Army general in the American Civil War. Buried near Lawrenceville, where he owned a plantation. 
 Bryant Stith, former University of Virginia and NBA basketball player.

References

Towns in Virginia
Towns in Brunswick County, Virginia
County seats in Virginia